St. Ferdinand College is a private, Catholic coeducational basic and higher education institution in Ilagan City, Isabela, Philippines. It was established in 1950 by the Knights of Columbus Ilagan Council 3705. Its formal operation was in the School Year 1951–1952 with classes offering from Kindergarten to College Level.

St. Ferdinand College is the only Catholic educational institution located in Ilagan City, Isabela, Philippines, and is one of the leading educational institutions in Isabela duly recognized by the Commission on Higher Education (CHED) and the Philippine Association of Colleges and Universities Commission on Accreditation (PACUCOA). Being recognized for its good facilities and competent staff, SFC served as the contest venue in the 1999 National School Press Conference on February 8–12, 1999.
 
For several years now, SFC remains the source of students for scholarship admission to the Ateneo de Manila University and University of the Philippines in Region 02. In-School Board Review for Criminology is now offered and it is presently linked with the University of Baguio. A Review Program for the Licensure Examination for Teachers (LET) has also started in Summer of 1999. This is a continuing service afforded by the school to help students prepare for the Board Exams at an affordable cost.

At present, St. Ferdinand College has one satellite campus in Cabagan in the same province headed by Natividad A. Dela Cruz.

History

St. Ferdinand College was established in September 1950, based on Christian democratic principles dedicated to the original objectives of its original founders, the Knights of Columbus Ilagan Council 3705.
	 
With the able services of dynamic and scientifically oriented faculty and administrators, the college has offered a kind of education that prepares the student for life. It provides every student with moral and intellectual training in a Christian atmosphere so that they may become efficient and ready to play a dynamic role in the growth of the country.
 
St. Ferdinand College had its formal operation in the school year 1951-1952 and offered kindergarten up to college level. It started occupying three small and temporary buildings enough to accommodate a complete elementary school with only one section each per grade level; a complete secondary level with only seven sections; and a handful of college students enrolled in Liberal Arts and in Elementary Education.
 
In the first year of its existence, St. Ferdinand College was operated purely by lay teachers and administrators, but because of its desire to propagate a stronger and more firm Christian education, the late Rev. Msgr. Ricardo A. Jamias, one of the founders and spiritual director invited the Franciscan Sisters to take over the reins of the college from 1952 up to S.Y 1974–1975.
 
During the S.Y 1952–1953, the newly constructed main building was occupied. The permit was granted by the Bureau of Private Schools to open courses in Education and Commerce. Four years later, the college reaped the first crop of graduates at the college level. Full recognition of all courses offered was granted in its fourth and fifth years of operation.
 
The coming of the Franciscan sisters under the very able and energetic direction of Sr.Agnes Encarnacion gave an impetus to their enrollment and from then on there was a yearly increase in each of the three departments. The major turning point of the college came as a result of the opening of a new course in education, the BSEEd. There was then a great demand for graduates to finish this course. The majority of the public school teachers were only ETC graduates. These undergraduates rushed to SFC to enroll which resulted in a dramatic increase in the student population in the College Department.
 
The biggest problem facing the school as a result of the increase in enrollment was the lack of classrooms. The main building, which was occupied by the three departments, the library, the laboratories, and the offices, was not enough. The college had to look for means by which it could accommodate all the students. The school Board of Trustees decided to act and secured a loan for the construction of separate buildings for the elementary, secondary, and HE practices houses.

During the year 1962, the ROTC unit was activated which added more attraction to male students. A separate ROTC and Armory building was immediately constructed for that purpose. In the succeeding years, new major fields of learning were opened: Accounting, Banking and Finance, and Management in Commerce; English, Mathematics, History, Science, and Filipino under Education. This led to the establishment of a separate College of Arts and Sciences, and College of Commerce and Secretarial.
 
In 1965, the Graduate Course (the first throughout the valley) was opened. This led to the expansion of the library with the purchase of hundreds of volumes of books to meet the requirements arising from the increase in student enrollment.
 
Being fully recognized by the government, all the school's graduate and postgraduate offerings are now well-established, and have graduated many MA's, MBA's, and MPA's since. In 1993, a Ph.D. course was opened. The pioneer batch from this postgraduate course graduated in the SY 1995–1996.
 
The School of Midwifery was established in 1986. Its first batch of graduates includes a topnotcher in the Board Exams. The Vocational Tech School was also put up in the year 1987 but it was closed years after because of dwindling enrollment.

The decade of the 90s has witnessed significant changes which have been taking place in college. Under permit 002 granted by the DECS, the School started to offer a Bachelor of Science in Nursing (BSN) in the S.Y. 1992–1993. Again, the School was in the national limelight when a BSN graduate in Batch '98 was one of the top notchers in the Nursing Licensure Examination. It was during the S.Y. 1993-1994 when the following courses were offered: Bachelor of Science in Management-major in Legal Management (which was also later closed); Two Year Medical Secretarial Courses. The school offered a Bachelor of Science in Criminology course during S.Y. 1994-95 under the headship of the dean of the AB Department.
 
Because of the massive transfer of students to SFC, Msgr. Ricardo Jamias Bldg. which houses the administrative offices, libraries, and classrooms of the College of Education and College of Arts and Sciences underwent massive renovations while the Our Lady of Lourdes Bldg. underwent finishing touches. A year earlier, the Our Lady of Visitation building was constructed to provide adequate and comfortable rooms for secondary students. In the year 1997, the Our Lady of Perpetual Help building was completed to meet the growing demands of elementary graders. Also, a multi-purpose laboratory was opened for the High School and Elementary for their Home Technology, food processing, textile and sewing, and handicraft-making practicum. A fourth floor has been added to the Lourdes building and a 500-seater auditorium complete with a sound and stage lighting system was constructed. The hall was named Arranz Auditorium in honor of the late Judge Manuel Arranz and Mrs. Magdalena Arranz, the school's first directress. The old seminary building across Mabini St. had been leased by the school for paramedical courses. The building has been completely rehabilitated and its laboratories were completely upgraded. Due to the increasing student population, the school likewise leased the old rectory and converted it into classrooms for the college department.
 
Two colleges under the supervision of their own deans were established, the College of Accountancy and the College of Criminology in S.Y. 1996–97. During that school year, new courses were offered namely, BS Biology and BS Nutrition and Dietetics. These, however, were closed two years after because of poor enrollment. The school envisions opening more courses in the next school year, 1999–2000. SFC is now in the process of securing permits from the Commission on Higher Education (CHED) for the possible operation of new courses which include BS Information Technology (BSIT), BS Information Management (BSIM), BS in Computer Science (BSCS), BSEd-Religious Education; Health Science; BSC-Public Administration and AB majors Political in Science and Economics.

Accredited programs
To date, SFC has the following accredited programs:

Patron Saint

Saint Ferdinand of Castile was born near Salamanca, Spain, c. 1199; died in Seville, Spain, on May 30, 1252; canonized in 1671 at the request of Philip IV. Ferdinand was the son of Alphonso IX, king of León, and Berengaria, the oldest daughter of Alphonso III, king of Castile. His maternal grandmother was the daughter of Henry II of England, and her sister Blanche became the mother of Saint Louis of France. The death of Berengaria's brother, Henry, left her heiress to the throne of Castile in 1217, but she ceded her rights to the 18-year- old Ferdinand. He was a stern, but a forgiving ruler who ignored personal slights, and an excellent administrator. The archbishop of Toledo, Rodrigo Ximenes, was chancellor of Castile and his principal adviser for many years. Ferdinand married Beatrice, daughter of King Philip of Swabia in 1219.

Upon the death of his father in 1230, Ferdinand became king of León. There was opposition to this, for there were supporters of the claim of his two half-sisters, but his union of the two kingdoms made a recovery from the Moors possible. He campaigned against the Moors without respite for 27 years, and his success won the great devotion of his people. He recaptured the greater part of Andalusia, including Ubeda, Cordova (1236), Murcia, Jaen, Cadiz, and Seville (1249).

It was in the battle of Xeres, when only 10 or 12 Spanish lives were lost, that Saint James (Santiago) was said to have been seen leading the host on a white horse. Saint James's chronicle is a principal source for Ferdinand's achievements. Ferdinand's military efforts were not so much imperialistic in motivation as driven by a wish to save Christians from the dominance of infidels. Although he was a warrior, it was said of him that "he feared the curse of one old woman more than a whole army of Moors." In thanksgiving for his victories, Ferdinand rebuilt the cathedral in Burgos and converted the great mosque of Seville into a church. He restored to the Cathedral of Santiago de Compostella the bells that had been removed by the Moors. Once the Moors and Jews submitted, he pursued a course of tolerance, while encouraging the friars to convert them.

Ferdinand was the founder of the famed University of Salamanca in 1243. He married Joan of Ponthieu on the death of Beatrice. By his second wife, he was the father of Eleanor, wife of King Edward I of England. Upon his death, he was buried in the habit of a Franciscan friar in the cathedral of Seville. At his death, he has popularly acclaimed a saint but canonical recognition took another 400 years (Attwater, Benedictines, Delaney, White). King Saint Ferdinand is depicted in art as a crowned knight with a greyhound. He is dressed in royal regalia, with crosses on his breast, and a dog at his feet (Roeder). He is the patron saint of persons in authority (rulers, governors, magistrates, etc.) --a result of his wise appointments; the poor and prisoners (over whom such person rule); engineers (a result of his technical military skills), and the Spanish army (White)

SFC Hymn
Beloved Alma Mater, all hail!

Fair gem of our Valley,

St. Ferdinand College, 'neath your standard we rally.

For you raise an army for Christ

whose royal blood runs red

for the glory of our Mother Church

a royal road they tread.

Our hearts beat high for you

within us, high ideals burn,

"For Christ the King!" our battle cry,

Ah! all of hell we spurn.

We pledge our oath of fealty,

yeah! Each of us your knight,

for God and country and for you,

We live and strive and fight.

References

Education in Ilagan
Universities and colleges in Isabela (province)